Wes Felton (W. Ellington Felton, Dub Ell) is an American singer/poet/actor/emcee born and raised in Washington DC.

Personal life

Wes Felton had a very musical upbringing. His father is Hilton C. Felton, a jazz pianist who had performed with George Benson, Grant Green and many others. 
Wes has a son named Tobias.

Music

Wes Felton started out with a lot of open mic nights. As a teenager he performed on the Lollapalooza tour and at the Apollo Theater. Ellington has been on stage with Mos Def, De La Soul, Meshell Ndegeocello and with his mentor UK Soul legend Omar.
He has been crowned "the future folk-soul hero" by Complex Magazine for his vocals on Prince Paul’s Politics of the Business album.

Collaborations

His collaboration with JLaine and TFox under the name Antithesis has so far resulted in two releases on Tasteful Licks.
W. E. Felton has also been working with Raheem DeVaughn. Together they are The Crossrhodes.

Acting

Felton studied theater for four years at Carnegie Mellon University in Pittsburgh.
In 1999, he starred in the critically acclaimed hip-hop play Rhyme Deferred, performed at the Kennedy Center, the National Black Theatre Festival, and the Nuyorican Poets Café. Ellington had a role in Multitudes of Mercies, a movie that aired on BET worldwide December 1, 2005 as a part of World AIDS Day. His most recent film with the Thievery Corporation is called Babylon Central.

Writing

Wes Felton started writing when he was 13. He has so far published two books of poetry.

Discography

Releases
1996: Experiments, self-released
1997: The Final Day, self-released
2001: Soul Sonnets, Art Hurts
2003: Bluetopia, Art!Hurts/Toronto August Music
2005: Postcards From the Edge
2006: A Dub Supreme, Art Hurts
2006: Outrospective: Me Then, Me Now, Genesis Poets Music
2008: Distraction City, Tasteful Licks Records
2009: Dub Ell 101 (the Vault vol.1), Hilton's Concept/Art Hurts
2010: Land of Sheep, Ruled By Pigs, Ran By Wolves, self-released
2013: Imagine The Future, self-released

Wes Felton x KeepanEyeonTheProduct 

2018: Kings in the Wilderness, Fresh Kids Music Group

The Crossrhodes

2004: Limited Budget, Unlimited Quality, Urban Ave Music/Art Hurts
2005: The Invitation, Urban Ave Music/Art Hurts
2017: "Footprints on the Moon", BMG/368 MUSIC GROUP

Antithesis

2008:  Antithesis, Tasteful Licks Records
2010: Love Daze, Tasteful Licks Records

Production

2005: The Love Experience, Jive Records

Appears On

2002: The Healing by Urban Ave 31, song: Growing Up, Urban Ave Music
2003: The Healing Pt.2 by Urban Ave 31, song: Antidote, Urban Ave Music
2003: Politics of the Business, by Prince Paul, song: Beautifully Absurd, Razor & Tie
2004: Thinking Back Looking Forward, Neosonic Productions
2004: Never Scared by Chris Rock, song: Black Poet, DreamWorks
2004: Moments of Clarity by Wayna, song: So Long Heartache, Wayna
2004:   "All Seasons" by the illpoets.com Collective, song: "Fall"
2005: The Love Experience, Jive Records
2006: Ink Is My Drink, Rawkus Records
2006: Ruff Drafts Volume 1, JapaNUBIA Musik
2008: A Mind on a Ship Through Time, Tasteful Licks Records
2008: Square Binizz, Resurrection Records
2008: Conflict by Sy Smith, song: Reach Down In Your Soul, Sy Smith Music
2009: Music Fan First by Eric Roberson, song: The Hunger, Blue Erro Soul
2018: Fresh Kids Vol.1 by Fresh Kids, song: Horror Story, Fresh Kids Music Group
2018: ...Smile by Davy Fresh, song: Black Pride, Fresh Kids Music Group

See also

 JLaine
 Tasteful Licks Records
 Mos Def
 Raquel "Ra" Brown

References

External links 
Tasteful Licks
Wes Felton on Myspace
Wes Felton on Last.fm
Wes Felton on YouTube

Living people
African-American poets
American male poets
20th-century African-American male singers
Singers from Washington, D.C.
Year of birth missing (living people)
Carnegie Mellon University College of Fine Arts alumni
21st-century African-American male singers